Fluid bonding may refer to:

 A process in polymer science
 An agreement between partners in a relationship to practice unprotected sexual intercourse

wiktionary:fluid-bonded